Ario may refer to:

Places
Ario Municipality, Mexico
Ario de Rosales, main town of Ario Municipality

Other
Ario Barzan, who was an ancient royal Persian commander who led a last stand of the Persian army against Alexander the Great.
The group of Ito Yokado
Ario (software), a client for the Music Player Daemon and XMMS2
Arius, a Christian priest in Alexandria, Egypt in the early fourth century
Arío, a musician from Costa Rica and former member of Glaciar
Ario-, Gaulic surname related to the designation "Aryan"